Clyde Spires is a 13,267-foot-elevation (4,044 meter) mountain summit located on the crest of the Sierra Nevada mountain range in California, United States. It is situated on the boundary shared by Kings Canyon National Park with John Muir Wilderness, and along the common border of Fresno County with Inyo County.
The west spire is slightly higher than the east spire.

History

The first ascent of the spires was made July 22, 1933, by Norman Clyde, Jules Eichorn and Ted Waller, who were members of the Sierra Club. They named the landform for Norman Clyde (1885–1972), the leader of the group and legendary mountaineer credited with 130 first ascents, most of which were in the Sierra Nevada. The toponym has been officially adopted by the United States Board on Geographic Names.

Climate
Clyde Spires is located in an alpine climate zone. Most weather fronts originate in the Pacific Ocean, and travel east toward the Sierra Nevada mountains. As fronts approach, they are forced upward by the peaks (orographic lift), causing them to drop their moisture in the form of rain or snowfall onto the range. Precipitation runoff from this geographic feature drains north to Bishop Creek, and south into Middle Fork Kings River.

Gallery

See also
 
 List of the major 4000-meter summits of California

References

External links
 Weather forecast: Clyde Spires
 Clyde Spires rock climbing: Mountainproject.com
 Clyde Spires (photo): Flickr

Inyo National Forest
Mountains of Inyo County, California
Mountains of Fresno County, California
Mountains of Kings Canyon National Park
Mountains of the John Muir Wilderness
North American 4000 m summits
Mountains of Northern California
Sierra Nevada (United States)